Mount Staley is a mountain, 2,560 m, at the south end of Salamander Range, Freyberg Mountains. Mapped by United States Geological Survey (USGS) from surveys and U.S. Navy air photos, 1960–64. Named by Advisory Committee on Antarctic Names (US-ACAN) for James T. Staley, biologist at Hallett Station, summer 1962–63.

Mountains of Victoria Land
Pennell Coast